The Gravy Train, also commonly known as The Dion Brothers, is a 1974 American crime-comedy film directed by Jack Starrett, written by Terrence Malick (under the pseudonym David Whitney) and Bill Kerby, and starring Stacy Keach and Frederic Forrest.

Although initially overlooked by audiences and critics alike, it has in recent years developed a cult following, and has been highly praised by filmmakers such as Quentin Tarantino and David Gordon Green. The film is still relatively obscure and hard to find, as there has never been any official VHS or DVD release.

Plot
Two West Virginia brothers quit their jobs as coal miners in order to make their fortune from armed robbery.

Cast
Stacy Keach as Calvin
Frederic Forrest as Rut
Margot Kidder as Margue
Barry Primus as Tony
Richard Romanus as Carlo
Denny Miller as Rex
Robert Phillips as Gino

Legacy
Despite a limited theatrical run and no subsequent VHS or DVD releases, The Gravy Train has still become somewhat of a cult film. David Gordon Green has cited it as one of his five favorite films of all time, as a major influence on his film Pineapple Express (2008), and as "the funniest movie ever made". Green also screened the film in a film series he curated at the Brooklyn Academy of Music.

Quentin Tarantino screened the film at his 2nd QT-Fest in 1998, and again in 2006 at his Best of QT-Fest.

References

External links

 

1974 films
1970s crime comedy films
American crime comedy films
Films directed by Jack Starrett
Films scored by Fred Karlin
Columbia Pictures films
1970s English-language films
1970s American films